The Costa Rica Institute of Technology (TEC) is a university in Costa Rica specializing in engineering and advanced science and research, modeled as an institute of technology.

The TEC is a national autonomous institution of higher education, dedicated to teaching, research and extension in technology and associated sciences. It was created by Law No. 4777 on 10 June 1971.

The TEC offers undergraduate and graduate studies in fields including engineering (construction, industrial production, electronics, industrial maintenance, biotechnology, mechatronics, computers), computer science and business management.

History

Establishment 
Rafael Ángel González Chaves a public school teacher from San Ramón was one of the first proponents of creating an institute of technology in the country. During the later part of the 1960s he was looking for supporters to introduce a bill that would create the institute. His efforts finally paid off when on June 10, 1971, president José Figueres Ferrer signed a law that mandated the creation of the Instituto Tecnológico de Costa Rica (Costa Rica Institute of Technology). The signing ceremony was held in the province of Cartago which was chosen as the location for the school's main campus.

At the time president Figueres indicated the need to emulate the successful models from other technology schools such as TEC de Monterrey, from whom he indicated he would request assistance in order to kickstart the project.

History 

Vidal Quirós Berrocal, a civil engineer was its first rector. The institute began functioning from a small house in downtown Cartago, and its first educational programs started in March 1973. A few years later thanks to a loan from the Inter-American Development Bank, the institute moved to its current main campus in Dulce Nombre district.

In 2009 the institute began offering bachelor's degrees in Computer Engineering and Information Technology Administration. In 2011 TEC invested over $1 million in equipment, infrastructure and personnel related to nanotechnology.

Name change 

While the legal name of the institution is still , it should be known in Spanish, as stated by the institution's identity manual, as just the "", however in English, the identity manual states that due to published research works, the name should be Costa Rica Institute of Technology.

Campuses 
The main campus is located in the outskirts of downtown Cartago, in Dulce Nombre district. There are regional campuses located in Santa Clara, San Carlos, downtown San José, near downtown Alajuela
 and Limon.

References

Universities in Costa Rica
Educational institutions established in 1971
Institutions of Costa Rica
Forestry education
Buildings and structures in Cartago, Costa Rica
Buildings and structures in Cartago Province